Automaton Transfusion is a 2006 American independent horror film written and directed by Steven C. Miller.

The film was shot on location in Orlando, Florida on an estimated budget of $30,000. It is intended to be the first of a trilogy of horror films and emulates classic examples of the genre; however, as of 2023, no sequel has been made. The film was purchased and released by Dimension Extreme, the straight-to-DVD genre arm of The Weinstein Company.

Plot
In the early 1970s, while the majority of Americans were focused on events in Vietnam, the United States Army was secretly developing a way to resurrect and control dead bodies. Their intention was to have the dead fight instead of the living, but the experiments were shut down when the reanimated corpses were unable to control their hunger for human flesh.

Thirty years later, the army decides to reopen the project. Grover City, because of its remote location, would be the home of their main testing facilities. Without warning, the Grover City experiments go horribly wrong and the reanimated corpses go on a rampage, eating everyone in sight.

With the town overtaken by zombies, a group of High School seniors takes it upon themselves to fight back and find a cure for the disease.

Cast 
 Garrett Jones - Chris
 Juliet Reeves - Jackie
 William Howard Bowman - Scott
 Rowan Bousaid - Tim
 Ashley Elizabeth Pierce - Simone
 Kendra Farner	Kendra Farner as Melissa
 Joel Ezra Hebner as Lance 
 Kevin J. O'Neill as Dr. Swartz
 John Youmans as The Bartender
 Larry Miller as Lee
 Jeff Denton as Jon
 Chris Shepardson as Charles
 Jason Brague as Matty
James Anlage as Zombie

Reception
Rotten Tomatoes, a review aggregator, reports that 38% of eight surveyed critics gave the film a positive review; the average rating was 5.3/10.  Brad Miska of Bloody Disgusting praised the film, giving it a 3½ out of 5, and closing his review with, "Even with its low budget flaws, Automaton Transfusion is the Holy Grail of true independent horror films. After sifting through buckets and buckets of pure sh-t, it's such a relief to finally get that slice of pie I've been longing for. Steven C. Miller will be a household name by the end of 2007, you just watch, Automaton Transfusion is only the beginning". In a review for DVD Verdict, Gordon Sullivan commended the gore and the ingenuity of the filmmakers considering their lack of money and time, but also criticized many aspects (such as the pacing, picture quality, and plot) of the film, and stated, "It feels like a video game: get the chainsaw power-up, go to the school gym, kill the zombies, get the serum. In a video game, this might be fun, but these characters aren't particularly well-drawn, so following them around a poorly-established town isn't very enjoyable". Dread Central's Steve Barton awarded a 2½ out of 5, and said, "Automaton Transfusion does a few things right, but sadly it gets most things wrong" and "I can't help but feel a bit queasy as the scent of missed opportunity permeates the air. I wanted to love this movie. I wanted this to be the next big thing. It just wasn't". Fellow Dread Central reviewer Joshua Siebalt gave Automaton Transfusion an even lower score of 1½, and called it an unimaginative "Hot Topic horror film" and "trainwreck" that consisted of almost nothing but one-dimensional characters "running and bleeding".

References

External links
 

2006 films
2006 horror films
American teen films
American independent films
2006 independent films
American splatter films
American zombie films
Films shot in Florida
Dimension Films films
Films directed by Steven C. Miller
2006 directorial debut films
2000s English-language films
2000s American films